Deshbandhu Para  is located at Dalkhola, Uttar Dinajpur in the Indian state of West Bengal. It is Ward No. 04 in Dalkhola Municipality.

Description
It has a Sub-Post Office, a Sub-Register Office and Dalkhola PHE.

Cities and towns in Uttar Dinajpur district